American Intercon School (AIS) is a private general education school accredited by the Ministry of Education, Youth and Sports with a Khmer-American curriculum from Preschool to Grade 12. It operates in six campuses in Phnom Penh, one campus in Siem Reap and one campus in Takeo, Cambodia.

History 
American Intercon School is a subsidiary of the Mengly J. Quach Education and a sister company of Aii language center. It was founded in Phnom Penh on October 10, 2005, by Mengly Jandy Quach.

The Ministry of Education, Youth and Sports (Cambodia) allowed American Intercon School to prepare for the ASEAN's Quality Education award  held in Brunei in 2015.

The School had developed to seven campuses across the Phnom Penh City and Siem Reap with an enrollment of over 8,500 students in 2022-2023.

During Covid-19 period
As the COVID-19 pandemic developed in Cambodia, the founder of the school, Mengly Jandy Quach warned that "the pandemic itself was not the biggest problem for schoolchildren but the mental and physical trauma they had to go through with keeping up their studies via online and staying home for so long." the American Intercon School was part of select schools to remain open in July 2020, due to compliance to official rules of the Ministry for Health. While calling for prudence, Quach also alerted the government on the urgent need to reopen schools in Cambodia because of the very limited access of the population to technologies used for online learning.

School Life 
American Intercon School is divided into four sections: Preschool (Preschool and Kindergarten), Elementary (from Grade 1 to Grade 6), Junior High School (Grade 7 to Grade 9 and High School (Grade 10 to 12). The academic year at the American Intercon School is divided into two semesters beginning in the middle of August, and the beginning of January. 

The School emphasizes the transmission soft skills in an effort to provide holistic education to its students.

Campuses 
American Intercon School is operating eight campuses in Phnom Penh, Siem Reap and Takeo:
 Mao Tse Toung Branch (Head Office) is located along Mao Tse Toung Blvd, Sangkat Tumnup Teuk, Khan Boeung Keng Kang
 Toul Kork Branch is located on Street 289, Sangkat Boeung Kak I, Khan Toul Kork (in front of Toul Kork Primary School).
 Chak Angre Branch is located at Building 824, National Road 2, Sangkat Chak Angre Krom, Khan Meanchey (Opposite Preah Noray Roundabout, Takhmao City or Kandal Branch).
 Chom Chao Branch, Building No. 222, Veng Sreng Street, Chrey Kong Village, Sangkat Choam Chao 2, Khan Por Senchey, Phnom Penh.
 Phsar Thmey Branch, Phnom Penh, Building No. 1C and 13D, Street 53, Corner of 154, Sangkat Phsar Thmey 3, Khan Daun Penh, Phnom Penh.
 Chroy Changvar Branch, Building No. 158JKLM, National Road No 6A, Sangkat Chroy Changvar, Khan Chroy Changvar, Phnom Penh.
 Siem Reap Campus, National Road No. 6, Sala Kanseng Village, Svay Dangkum District, Siem Reap City, Siem Reap Province. 
 Takeo Branch, National Road No 2, Daun Keo City, Takeo Province

Recognition 
With the highest pass rates in Cambodia in the National High School Exit Examinations for five years in a row between  2015 and 2019, American Intercon School was recognized by the Ministry of Education Youth and Sport of Cambodia as the top leading school in Management, Education Administration, Quality of Teaching and Best Environment out of 220 schools and institutions in Phnom Penh and one of the 10 best schools in Cambodia according to Elite Education.

Awards and Certificates
 The SME One Asia Awards 2012 in the Overseas Enterprise Award in Singapore
 The Majestic Five Continents Award For Quality And Excellence 2013 in Geneva, Switzerland
 The International Star for Leadership in Quality Award 2013 in Paris, France
 UAE The BIZZ ARABIC 2013 AWARD for Quality and CSR Certificate in Dubai, UAE
 Ranked “Best Standard School Campus” in International Science and Education Competitions 
 Best Enterprise in Educational Sphere 2013 by Europe Business Assembly, which sells "fake awards"
 European Awards for Best Practices 2014 in Brussels, Belgium
 Golden Medal for Quality & Service Award Sao Paulo, Brazil, June 2014
 The 9th TAYO ASEAN Award (Ten Accomplished Youth Organizations Award) in Bandar Seri Begawan, Brunei Darussalam, 2014
 The Certification in Corporate Social Responsibility 2014 in Houston, Texas, the United States of America
 Education Partnership Leader Award the Worlddidac 2015, in Hong Kong, China

References

External links 
 American Intercon School - Official website

Schools in Phnom Penh